On December 29, 1975, a bomb detonated near the TWA baggage reclaim terminal at LaGuardia Airport in New York City. The blast killed 11 people and seriously injured 74. The perpetrators were never officially identified or charged, although the most common consensus is that it was either anti-Yugoslavian Croats that were part of OTPOR or Communist Belgrade's own UDBA working to malign OTPOR through sabotage (a common strategy of theirs). The attack occurred during a four-year period of heightened terrorism within the United States: 1975 was especially volatile, with bombings in New York City and Washington, D.C., and two assassination attempts on President Gerald Ford.

The LaGuardia Airport bombing was at the time the deadliest attack by a non-state actor to occur on American soil since the 1927 Bath School bombings, which killed 44 people. It was the deadliest attack in New York City since the 1920 Wall Street bombing, which killed 38 people, until the September 11 attacks in 2001.

Attack
The bomb exploded at approximately 6:33 p.m. in the TWA baggage claim area in the central terminal. Investigators later came to believe the equivalent of 25 sticks of dynamite had been placed in a coin-operated locker located next to the baggage carousels. The bomb blew the lockers apart, sending fragmentation flying across the room; the fragmentation caused all 11 deaths and injured several people. Others were injured by shards of glass broken off the terminal's plate glass windows. The force of the bomb ripped a  hole in the  reinforced concrete ceiling of the baggage claim area. The subsequent fire in the terminal took over an hour to get under control.

The death toll could have been much worse if the area had not been largely clear of passengers at the time; two flights from Cincinnati and Indianapolis had arrived at 6:00 p.m. and most of the passengers on these flights had already left the area. Most of the dead and injured were airport employees, people waiting for transportation, and limo drivers.

Aftermath
One witness, 27-year-old Indianapolis lawyer H. Patrick Callahan, was with his law partner at the time of the bombing. "My law partner and I had gone outside to see where the limo was...We had just gone back and we were leaning against one of those big columns. The people who died were standing next to us," said Callahan. When Callahan awakened, all he could see was dust, and he could not even see his companion, who was two feet away at the time. The blast damaged Callahan's hearing, which did not return for a week. "The bomb appeared to have been placed in the lockers directly adjacent to the carousel that the luggage was on...It was evil," said Callahan.

The bombing was condemned by Pope Paul VI and President Ford. Ford said he was "deeply grieved at the loss of life and injuries". He cut short his vacation in Vail, Colorado, and ordered FAA head John McLucas to look into ways of tightening airport security. Then Mayor of New York City Abraham Beame said the bombing "was the work of maniacs. We will hunt them down."

Airports throughout the country including in Washington, Cleveland, and St. Louis were evacuated after receiving hoax bomb calls.

Investigations
Queens Chief of Detectives Edwin Dreher led the investigation. He immediately went to the airport and summoned by radio all available detectives from the five boroughs, launching at the time the largest criminal investigation in the NYPD's history. The investigation included 120 NYPD detectives, 600 FBI agents, ATF agents, and Port Authority investigators, who concluded that the bomb was made of either TNT or plastic explosives and was controlled by household items such as a Westclox alarm clock and an Eveready 6-volt lantern battery. One of the leads suggested was a paroled political activist who had been imprisoned for a previous bombing. The activist's brother had been arrested at LaGuardia on a fraud charge the day before the bombing. Subsequent investigations showed that the activist had an alibi and was ruled out as a suspect. 

The investigation may have been hampered by the cleanup operation where victims and debris were removed from the scene.

Following the attack, telephone calls were made to several US airports warning them of further attacks, but these were hoaxes. In addition, an anonymous person called the news agency UPI claiming to be from the Palestine Liberation Organization (PLO) and responsibility for the attack. However, the PLO spokesman at the United Nations denied all responsibility and condemned "the dastardly attack against the innocent people at LaGuardia". The PLO believed the call linking it to the bombing was an attempt to sabotage talks at the UN scheduled for January 12 regarding the plight of Palestinians.

Other suggested perpetrators included the Mafia, the F.A.L.N. (who were responsible for the bombing of New York's Fraunces Tavern in January 1975), and the Jewish Defense League, though there was nothing to link these groups to the bombing other than past violence. Many note similarities between this bombing and the plane high-jacking and bombing of the same airport the following year by Croatian terrorist group OTPOR, with the leader of the group even giving a confession to being involved before walking back that same confession claiming it was made because of sleep deprivation. Convicted Croatian ultranationalist and terrorist Zvonko Bušić was considered a person of interest in the bombing. While he spent over 30 years in prison for another bombing, he was never charged in the airport bombing. This incident also involved a bomb that went off seemingly unintentionally and there are further claims of both bombs being sabotaged by Yugoslav Secret Police UBDA, whom are known to have infiltrated OTPOR, in order to malign the resistance group. There is a belief among some that the FBI caused the bombing to never be solved in order to protect their own informant(s), based on interpretations of the otherwise confusing manner the FBI handled the 1976 event and prevented access to the NYPD to the suspects of said latter event after the arrest of the suspects involved.

Since there was no credible claim of responsibility, investigators concluded the bomb had gone off at the wrong time and that the intent had been for it to detonate either 12 hours earlier or later, when the area would have been nearly clear of people. John Schindler, writing for The Observer, suggested the Yugoslav State Security Administration (UDBA or UDSA) orchestrated the bombing as a false flag attack as part of an ongoing effort to discredit Croatian dissidents.

The Air Transport Association offered a $50,000 reward for information leading to the arrest of the bombers.   the crime remained officially unsolved.

See also

 Crime in New York City
 Domestic terrorism in the United States
 List of terrorist incidents in 1975
 List of unsolved murders

References

1975 murders in the United States
1975 in New York City
1970s in Queens
Crimes in Queens, New York
December 1975 crimes
December 1975 events in the United States
Explosions in 1975
1975 LaGuardia Airport Bombing
Mass murder in 1975
Mass murder in New York (state)
Mass murder in New York City
Mass murder in the United States
Murder in New York City
Political violence in the United States
Terrorist attacks on airports
Terrorist incidents by unknown perpetrators
Terrorist incidents in New York City
Terrorist incidents in the United States in 1975
Unsolved mass murders in the United States
Building bombings in the United States
1970s crimes in New York City